"No. 1" is a song recorded by South Korean recording artist BoA. It was released on April 12, 2002, for her second studio album of the same name (2002) through SM Entertainment. In Japan, the song was released as a double A-side CD single with the track "Kiseki" on September 19, 2002, via Avex Trax. The single, titled "Kiseki / No. 1", was included in her second Japanese studio album Valenti (2003). "No. 1" was written by Kim Young-ah, while production was handled by Sigurd Røsnes and Ahn Ik-soo.

Musically, "No. 1" is a dance song that infuses elements of europop. It was met with positive reception upon its release, the CD single peaked at number three on the Japanese Oricon Singles Chart and was certified gold by the Recording Industry Association of Japan (RIAJ). In South Korea, "No. 1" won several awards, including the Most Popular Music Video daesang at the 2002 Mnet Music Video Festival and the Grand Prize at the annual SBS Gayo Daejeon. The song has been well received in retrospective reviews; in 2021, a panel of 35 music experts and critics organized by Seoul Shinmun and Melon deemed it as the greatest K-pop song of all-time.

Background and release 
According to a former SM Entertainment Jason Park, "No. 1" was not initially planned to serve as the lead single for BoA's album. It was originally composed by Norwegian producer Sigurd Røsnes ("Ziggy") and was one of the tracks on the agency's many demo CDs obtained during a business trip in Sweden in 2001. The demo eventually gained favorability from SM staff and executive producer Lee Soo-man. It was then originally slated to be a song by the label's in-house composer Yoo Young-jin, however, Park convinced Lee that "No. 1" would instead be a better choice for BoA's lead single after playing it a car ride for him.

Musically, "No. 1" is a dance song that incorporates stylistic elements from europop. The version released by BoA was written by Kim Young-ah, while arrangement of the track was handled by Ahn Ik-soo. In its initial production, Røsnes said "I'd programmed the drums and I knew that I wanted to write kind of an uplifting happy thing – something that would make you feel good". In Japan, it was selected as the second lead maxi CD single for BoA's second Japanese studio album Valenti, and was released as "Kiseki / No. 1" on September 19, 2002, by Avex Trax. The maxi CD contains the A-side track "Kiseki" and the B-side track "Flower", in addition to instrumental versions of the tracks. "Kiseki" was also used as Kose's "Luminous" CM song while "No. 1" was used as a theme song for the Busan 2002 Asian Games.

Songwriting controversy 
After the initial demo was selected for BoA's album in 2002, songwriter Kim Young-ah was offered ₩2 million (US$1,695) by SM Entertainment to write its Korean lyrics. Upon the song's release, SM signed a music copyright license agreement with Universal Music, who in 2003, registered Røsnes as its sole lyricist and composer to the Korean Music Copyright Association (KMCA). In 2011, Kim requested to the KMCA to withhold payments of its copyright royalties for Universal Music, and subsequently filed a lawsuit regarding the song's copyright status the following year. In July 2015, Kim was judged the rightful credit as the songwriter by the South Korean supreme court, and was awarded ₩45 million (US$40,000) in royalties as well as ₩5 million (US$4,400) in compensation for the 13 year-old ordeal.

Reception 
"No. 1" was met with positive reception in both South Korea and Japan. In Mnet's Gayo Best 27 half-year ranking of the top 100 popular songs, "No. 1" ranked at number three, placing behind Shinhwa's "Perfect Man" and Lee Seung-hwan's "Wrong". In Japan, the single "Kiseki / No. 1" was commercially successful. It peaked at number three on the weekly Oricon Singles Chart, where it became her first top-three single in the country; it charted for a total of 17 weeks. In October 2002, "Kiseki / No. 1" was certified gold by the Recording Industry Association of Japan (RIAJ) for physical shipments of 200,000 units. In December, it was revealed that "No. 1" was the most widely searched song of the year among South Korean netizens, as well as the most searched song among people wanting to confess their love. In addition, it was the year's fifth most downloaded mobile phone ringtone in the country.

Accolades

Impact and legacy 
BoA's debut Japanese album Listen to My Heart from earlier that year was met with breakthrough success for the Korean music industry, where it became the first million certified album by a non-Japanese artist as well as the first to top the Oricon album chart. Regarding the release of "No. 1", Michael Fuhr wrote that it acted as "not only a milestone in [BoA's] career as a transnational idol star, but also proved the viability of SM Entertainment's export strategy. It was the first time the company gained chart success in Korea and Japan with a song licensed from Europe." Music critic Lim Jin-mo believed that her success in Japan in the early 2000s was an unlikely achievement for a South Korean act, and opened many doors for Korean pop acts in the second largest music market in the world. Tamar Herman came to a similar conclusion, saying that "As a result, the Japanese music market became more familiar with Korean artistry and a major market for just about every other K-pop act that followed."

In an article coinciding with the release of her tenth Korean studio album in 2020, Korea JoongAng Daily deemed "No. 1" as the song that first brought her to the spotlight in South Korea, adding that "it is still considered her best hit." Speaking to the publication, BoA chose "No. 1" along with "Only One" among her best hits as the two top tracks of her career. South China Morning Posts Lucy Jeong noted the line "You're still my number one" as a popular catchphrase and fan cheer chant, writing that the "iconic song, which showcases Boa's powerful dancing and vocals as well as a cheerful upbeat style, is a go-to for other K-pop girl groups, like GFriend and Red Velvet, to perform as a dance cover."

In 2014, Mnet included "No. 1" in their Legend 100 listing of most influential songs in Korean popular music history since the 1960s. In The Dong-a Ilbos 2016 survey involving 2,000 people and 30 Korean music critics, it was voted as the fourth best female idol song in the past 20 years by both the public and music experts, the latter along with 2NE1's "I Am the Best" and Girls' Generation's "Into the New World". In a panel of 35 music experts and industry professionals organized by online portal Melon and newspaper Seoul Shinmun, "No. 1" was ranked the greatest K-pop song of all-time for its cultural significance, artistic quality and performance.

Track listing 
Japanese CD single
 "Kiseki" – 4:17
 "No. 1" – 3:13
 "Flower" – 3:30
 "Kiseki" (Instrumental) – 4:17
 "No. 1" (Instrumental) – 3:13
 "Flower" (Instrumental) – 3:30

Credits and personnel 
Credits adapted from MusicBrainz and Melon.

Korean version credits
 BoAlead vocals
 Kim Young-ahlyricist
 Sigurd Heimdal Røsnescomposer
 Ahn Ik-sooarranger

Japanese version credits

 BoAlead vocals
 Natsumi Watanabelyricist 
 Kosuke Morimotocomposer 
 Ken Matsubaraarranger 
 Ryoju Sonodalyricist 

 Sigurd Heimdal Røsnescomposer 
 Ahn Ik-sooarranger 
 Bouncebackcomposer 
 Akiraarranger

Charts and certifications

Daily and weekly charts

Certifications

Release history

References 

BoA songs
2002 singles
2002 songs
Avex Trax singles
Torch songs
South Korean synth-pop songs
Dance-pop songs
Songs written by Sigurd Rosnes